D. Knox Hanna was a member of the Michigan House of Representatives.  He was one of six members of the state House killed in the Kerns Hotel fire in Lansing on December 11, 1934.  Also killed were representatives Charles D. Parker, T. Henry Howlett, Vern Voorhees, John W. Goodwine, and Don E. Sias, along with state senator John Leidlein.  The men were in Lansing for a special session of the Michigan legislature.

References

Members of the Michigan House of Representatives
Accidental deaths in Michigan
1934 deaths
Deaths from fire in the United States
Year of birth missing